Dancefloor Deluxe is the third album and the first compilation album by Swedish eurodance group Alcazar. It was released in Sweden on August 25, 2004.

Track list

Standard edition 2004

Single disc edition 2005

Charts

References

Alcazar (band) albums
2004 compilation albums
2004 remix albums